St. Clair Shores is a suburban city bordering Lake St. Clair in Macomb County of the U.S. state of Michigan. Its population was 59,715 at the 2010 census.

Geography
A notable feature of St. Clair Shores is its  of canals. Most of these canals are found in the Nautical Mile, which is along Jefferson between 9 mile and 10 Mile.

Neighboring communities

History

Located along the shores of Lake St. Clair and inhabited by French settlers as early as 1710, during which time the area was referred to as L'anse Creuse, the future St. Clair Shores, Michigan, community would remain largely a rural farming area populated by largely French and German immigrant families into the early 20th century.  These local family surnames have survived into the 21st century and can be found both in the surnames of current day residents and among numerous residential street names.

From 1835 until 1843, the area was part of Orange Township, among the first townships platted in Michigan and part of Macomb County, Michigan.  In 1843, Orange Township was renamed Erin Township, in homage to the numerous Irish immigrants who had moved into the area and had begun to exert their political influence.

From 1843 until 1911, what would be incorporated as the Village of St. Clair Shores in 1925, was a part of Erin Township, parts of which make up today's suburban municipalities of Eastpointe, Roseville, and St. Clair Shores. In 1911, the eastern portion of the township now occupied by St. Clair Shores was partitioned from Erin Township to become Lake Township, which existed until 2009, when residents of the village of Grosse Pointe Shores (that portion of Grosse Pointe Shores in Macomb County located within Lake Township) voted to incorporate as a city.  The Village of St. Clair Shores remained a part of Lake Township until, after numerous failed attempts, its residents voted to incorporate as the City of St. Clair Shores in January 1951.

Beginning around the time of the First World War, the lakefront community quickly became a favored playground for gamblers, rum runners, and lakefront tourists alike, culminating during Prohibition, but continuing through the Second World War era.  During these years, St. Clair Shores was the home to many popular roadhouses, blind pigs, and gambling establishments, such as the Blossom Heath Inn. St. Clair Shores' lakefront location and proximity to Canada coupled with a receptive and often participative community made it an advantageous haven for rum runners, and the area was actively involved in the rum running era of Prohibition. Local residents, politicians, and law enforcement of the era were known to sometimes conflict with both state and federal officials over their attempts to regulate these illegal, but economically vital, activities within the community.

The Eagle Pointe subdivision, one of many platted within the Village of St. Clair Shores during the early 20th century, was platted along a part of the lake shore in 1916. During the next few decades, dozens of subdivisions were platted among the local farmland, but most were not developed in earnest until the after the Second World War, when St. Clair Shores became the fastest-growing suburb of Detroit during the 1950s.

From 1927 until 1959, the community was the location of the Jefferson Beach Amusement Park, once a major lakefront attraction for the Detroit area and beyond. Opened in 1927, it once boasted the longest roller coaster in the United States and numerous other midway attractions, a large, ornate lakefront dance pavilion, and a large, sandy beach popular with swimmers and sun bathers. In 1955, a fire destroyed some of the attractions and buildings within the once-popular park, and this, coupled with changing public tastes, accelerated its demise. While the owners of Jefferson Beach Amusement Park considered rebuilding, by this time the park was not popular with local government officials, and the city council had begun exploring forcing the closure of the facility or purchasing it for public use. Instead, the park owners, who had previously started building an onsite marina facility, began to expand that part of the facility. By 1959, the remaining park amusements and buildings were demolished to make room for the greatly enlarged Jefferson Beach Marina.  All that remained of the once grand amusement park was its large, ornate lakefront dance coliseum, which for years thereafter was relegated to use as a marina storage facility and marine supply store until it, too, was destroyed by fire.

Attractions
The Nautical Mile, a mile-long, lakefront strip of Jefferson Avenue between Nine Mile and 10 Mile roads, features a nautical-themed streetscape, retail establishments, restaurants, boat dealers, and both private and civic marinas. This business district is dominated by the tallest structure in St. Clair Shores; the 28-story Shore Club Sky Tower, colloquially known as "9 Mile Tower", and located at the foot of Nine Mile Road and Jefferson Avenue on Lake Saint Clair.  The residential tower has become a prominent nautical landmark and its rooftop beacon can be seen for many miles.

St. Clair Shores is home to the longest-consecutively running preliminary program pageant of the Miss America Organization in Michigan and among the longest-running in the United States. Since 1953, the Miss St. Clair Shores Scholarship Program has offered scholarships to young women in the community ages 17–24. The pageant is held each July at the local South Lake High School Auditorium. Miss St. Clair Shores volunteers and serves her city during her preparation to compete at the Miss Michigan Pageant.

Dating back to its years as a popular lakefront entertainment destination, St. Clair Shores has a long connection to Detroit's musical history. In addition to the many past roadhouses that featured numerous national performing artists of the era, other notable music-related locations include the former Car City Records store, whose employees have included many from the Detroit music scene; the former Crows Nest East, a short-lived, but popular music venue of the late 1960s; and the former Shirley's Swinger Lounge.  Individuals and groups who played at or frequented these venues went on to regional and national success, including Bob Seger, the MC5, Iggy Pop, and The Frost.

St. Clair Shores, one of a few communities to lay claim to the "Hockeytown USA" moniker before the Detroit Red Wings and the city of Detroit, is renowned throughout both the US and Canada as a long-time youth hockey hotbed, largely related to its long-successful St. Clair Shores Hockey Association.  Once the home to the United States' first privately owned indoor ice hockey arena, Gordie Howe Hockeyland, St. Clair Shores also boasts two municipal indoor ice arenas at its civic recreation center.  Owing to its tremendously popular aforementioned youth hockey association, local high school hockey often dominated the local competition of the 1970s, with all three local high schools participating.  St. Clair Shores Lakeview High School went undefeated during its famed 1973 state high-school championship season. Although the once beloved Gordie Howe Hockeyland has since closed, youth hockey is still very popular in St. Clair Shores and vintage references to "Hockeytown USA" can still be found inside the St. Clair Shores Civic Arena.

Although its population has dropped from its peak in the early 1970s due to end of the baby boomer era and continued urban sprawl, St. Clair Shores continues to be a popular suburb of Detroit, owing largely to its advantageous lakefront location, its municipal park system, its fine recreational sports programs and facilities, and its three public school districts.

Demographics

2010 census
As of the census of 2010, there were 59,715 people, 26,585 households, and 15,932 families living in the city. The racial makeup of the city was 92.7% White, 3.9% African American, 0.3% Native American, 1.0% Asian, 0.2% from other races, and 1.7% from two or more races. Hispanics or  Latinos of any race were 1.7% of the population.

Of the 26,585 households,  24.6% had children under 18 living with them, 43.6% were married couples living together, 11.9% had a female householder with no husband present, 4.4% had a male householder with no wife present, and 40.1% were not families. About 35.1% of all households were made up of individuals, and 15.5% had someone living alone who was 65 or older. The average household size was 2.24, and the average family size was 2.90.

The median age in the city was 44.2 years; 19% of residents were under 18; 7% were between18 and 24; 24.9% were from 25 to 44; 29.7% were from 45 to 64; and 19.2% were 65 or older. The gender makeup of the city was 47.8% male and 52.2% female.

2000 census
As of the census of 2000, 63,096 people, 27,434 households, and 17,283 families were living in the city. The racial makeup of the city was 96.89% White, 0.69% African American, 0.28% Native American, 0.84% Asian],  0.20% from other races, and 1.10% from two or more races. Hispanics or Latinos of any race were 1.18% of the population.

Of the 27,434 households, 24.1% had children under 18 living with them, 49.5% were married couples living together, 10.0% had a female householder with no husband present, and 37.0% were not families. About 32.7% of all households were made up of individuals, and 16.3% had someone living alone who was 65 years of age or older.  The average household size was 2.28 and the average family size was 2.92.

In the city, the age distribution was 20.2% under 18, 6.2% from 18 to 24, 28.8% from 25 to 44, 23.1% from 45 to 64, and 21.8% who were 65 or older.  The median age was 42 years. For every 100 females, there were 90.9 males.  For every 100 females 18 and over, there were 86.8 males.

The median income for a household in the city was $49,047, and for a family was $59,245. Males had a median income of $46,614 versus $31,192 for females. The per capita income for the city was $25,009.  About 2.6% of families and 3.7% of the population were below the poverty line, including 4.4% of those under 18 and 4.9% of those 65 or over.

Education
St. Clair Shores has three school districts: South Lake Schools, which serves the southern portion of the city, Lakeview Public Schools, which serves the central portion of the city, and Lake Shore Public Schools, which serves the northern portion of the city. Each district operates one high school within the city.

Private, parochial schools include St. Germaine, St. Isaac Jogues, and St. Joan of Arc.

Notable people
 George Allen – football coach in the National Football League and United States Football League; member of the Pro Football Hall of Fame
 Dave Coulier – actor and comedian
 David Coulter – politician; Oakland County executive
 David Debol – member of the National Hockey League (NHL) Hartford Whalers, (1979–81)
 Anne Fletcher – dancer, choreographer, and film director
 Faye Grant – actress
 Donald Patrick Harvey – actor (Die Hard 2, Walker, Texas Ranger)
 Alto Reed – musician, saxophonist, and backing vocalist most notably as a member of The Silver Bullet Band
 Bob Samaras – basketball coach and author 
 Fred "Sonic" Smith – guitarist, member of the bands MC5 and Sonic's Rendezvous Band
 Werner Spitz – forensic pathologist
 Mark Wells – member of the 1980 United States Olympic ice hockey team (Miracle on Ice)
 Rachelle Consiglio-Wilkos – television producer and wife of television personality Steve Wilkos
 Thomas J. Wilson – chairman and CEO of Allstate
 John Ziegler Jr. (1952) – president of the NHL (1977–1992) and member of the Hockey Hall of Fame (1987)

See also

Grosse Pointe
Lake Saint Clair (North America)
Mount Clemens

References

External links
 Official Website of the City of St. Clair Shores

Cities in Macomb County, Michigan
Lake St. Clair
Metro Detroit
Coastal resorts in Michigan
Michigan populated places on Lake St. Clair
Populated places established in 1710
1951 establishments in Michigan